If You Really Want is an album by Raul Midón with The Metropole Orkest, released in September 14, 2018. This album was nominated for Best Jazz Vocal Album in the 61st Annual Grammy Awards.

Track listing
All compositions by Raul Midón except as indicated.
 "Ride on a Rainbow" – 4:12
 "God's Dream" – 4:41
 "If You Really Want" – 4:41
 "All Love Is Blind" – 3:22
 "Sunshine (I Can Fly)" (written by Albert Menendez, Luis Vega and Raul Midón) – 6:38
 "Ocean Dreamer" – 3:30
 "Pick Somebody Up" – 3:28
 "Everyone Deserves a Second Chance" (arranged by Miho Hazama) – 5:05
 "Sittin' in the Middle" – 5:34
 "Suddenly" – 3:50

Personnel
Musicians
Raul Midón – Vocals, Guitar
Metropole Orkest
Conductor – Vince Mendoza
Trumpet – , Jelle Schouten, Peter van Soest, Ray Bruinsma
Saxophone, Clarinet – Leo Janssen, Marc Scholten, Max Boeree, Paul van der Feen, Werner Janssen
Trombone – Bart Van Lier, Jan Bastiani, Jan Oosting
Bass Trombone – Bart van Gorp
Flute – Janine Abbas, Nola Exel
Horn – Jasper de Waal, Pieter Hunfeld
Oboe – Willem Luijt
Piano, Keyboards – Hans Vroomans
Electric Guitar, Acoustic Guitar – Peter Tiehuis
Double Bass – Arend Liefkes, Erik Winkelmann, Walter van Egeraat
Electric Bass, Acoustic Bass – Aram Kersbergen
Drums –  
Percussion – Eddy Koopman, Murk Jiskoot
Violin [1st] – Alida Schat, Arlia De Ruiter, David Peijnenborgh, Denis Koenders, Ewa Zbyszynska, Jasper van Rosmalen, Pauline Terlouw, Ruben Margarita
Violin [2nd] – Federico Nathan, Herman Van Haaren, Merel Jonker, Merijn Rombout, Robert Baba, Seija Teeuwen, Wim Kok
Cello – Annie Tangberg*, Emile Visser, Jascha Albracht, Maarten Jansen
Viola – Isabella Petersen, Julia Jowett, Marit Ladage, Mieke Honingh, Norman Jansen
Harp – Joke Schonewille

Production
 Raul Midón – producer, A&R,  engineer (recording, editing, overdubbing)
 Vince Mendoza – producer
 Gert-Jan Blom – artistic producer for Metropole Orkest

 Will Wakefield – A&R (senior director)
 Kathleen Midón – A&R

 Paul Dorin – assistant engineer (recording)
 Dirk Overeem – assistant engineer (recording)
 Darcy Proper – engineer (mastering)
 Tijmen Zinkhaan – engineer (mixing)
 Erik Van Der Horst – assistant engineer (mixing)

 Kathleen  – management
 Zot Management – management
 Sharon Green – management (marketing director)
 Fiona Bloom – public relations
 The Bloom Effect – public relations

 Raj Naik – art direction, design
 Samuel Prather – photography

References

2018 albums
Artistry Music albums
Raul Midón albums